Aksentsevo is a rural locality (a village) in Vtorovskoye Rural Settlement, Kameshkovsky District, Vladimir Oblast, Russia. The population was 73 as of 2010.

Geography 
Aksentsevo is located 29 km southwest of Kameshkovo (the district's administrative centre) by road. Novskoye is the nearest rural locality.

References 

Rural localities in Kameshkovsky District